Oliver Fuchs (born 16 March 1971) is an Austrian former professional tennis player.

Born in Bruck an der Mur, Fuchs reached a career high ranking of 217 on the professional tour. He qualified for the main draw of the 1989 Australian Open, beating Jonathan Canter and Martin Sinner en route, then lost in the first-round to Marty Davis in four sets. In 1990 he represented Austria at the World Team Cup.

References

External links
 
 

1971 births
Living people
Austrian male tennis players
People from Bruck an der Mur
Sportspeople from Styria